Sardis Lake may refer to:
Sardis Lake (Mississippi), USA
Sardis Lake (Oklahoma), USA